Ervin S. Duggan is a retired American media businessman who has served in several management positions, most notably as president of PBS.

Originally from South Carolina and a graduate of Davidson College, Duggan was appointed as a member of the Federal Communications Commission by President George H. W. Bush in 1990, possibly as a compromise candidate with more evangelical voters. Duggan became president of PBS in December 1993. He served in that position until his resignation in 1999. As president, Duggan sought to revitalize and strengthen PBS' fundraising capacity. Duggan also oversaw the production of several News and Documentary Emmy Awards winning programs like the Living Edens. His time, however, was characterized by some controversy over member stations weak control of members contact information and icy relationship between upper management and local stations. After leaving PBS, Duggan eventually settled in Palm Beach, Florida becoming the CEO of the Society of the Four Arts, leaving the organization for retirement in 2014.

References

External links

Living people
American chief executives
Davidson College alumni
Members of the Federal Communications Commission
PBS people
1939 births
George H. W. Bush administration personnel
Clinton administration personnel